Sabaoon TV is a 24-hour Pashto entertainment television channel based in Pakistan. It began transmitting on 17 March 2015 and carries popular dramas Hiras and Kali Pa Kali. It is the first Pashto high-definition television channel.

Current programs
Hiras by Bakht Rawan Bakht
Hujra (Host: Ali Yousafzai & Arshad Qamar) is cultural based program
Kali Pa Kali (Host: Ajmal khan Yousafzai) is a people and blogs based program
Common Sense (HOst: Wisal Khyal) is an entertainment program in which the common sense questions are asked
Da Qaam Ghag (Host: Adil Yousafzai & Khalid Ayub) is a current affairs programTesha e Ibrahimi (Host: Ibrahim Daood) a current affairs program
Saudi Time (Host: Deryab Dolatkhel & Seemab Yousafzai) Entertainment program/interview /function etc

See also
 List of television stations in Pakistan

References

External links
 Sabaoon TV's official website

Television stations in Pakistan
Pashto mass media
Pashto-language television stations
Television channels and stations established in 2015